The Gravedigger's Wife is a drama film, directed by Khadar Ayderus Ahmed and released in 2021. The film is a coproduction of companies from France, Somalia, Germany and Finland.

Ahmed's feature debut, the film was inspired by a death in his own family approximately a decade earlier. It was shot in 2019, although release was delayed until 2021 because of the COVID-19 pandemic and its disruptions of film distribution in 2020.

The film premiered in the International Critics' Week program at the 2021 Cannes Film Festival. It was subsequently screened at the 2021 Toronto International Film Festival, where it was one of the winners of the Amplify Voices Award. It was selected as the Somali entry for the Best International Feature Film at the 94th Academy Awards, the first time that Somalia had submitted a film.

Plot
Guled (Omar Abdi), a gravedigger in Djibouti, is struggling to raise money to pay for surgery when his wife Nasra (Yasmin Warsame) becomes gravely ill with kidney disease.

Awards and nominations

See also
 List of submissions to the 94th Academy Awards for Best International Feature Film
 List of Somalian submissions for the Academy Award for Best International Feature Film

References

External links

2021 films
2021 drama films
Finnish drama films
French drama films
German drama films
Somalian drama films
Films set in Djibouti
2020s French films